Les Saisies is a ski resort located in the Savoie départment of France. For those games, the resort hosted the biathlon and cross-country skiing events.

The resort also has alpine skiing trails for use and forms part of the Espace Diamant skiing region.

Les Saisies organized the 2014 European Company Sports Games.

Geography

Climate

Les Saisies has a subarctic climate (Köppen climate classification Dfc) closely bordering on a humid continental climate (Dfb).

References

1992 Winter Olympics official report. pp. 102–5. 
Official website

External links

Venues of the 1992 Winter Olympics
Olympic biathlon venues
Olympic cross-country skiing venues
Tourist attractions in Savoie
Ski stations in France
Sports venues in Savoie